Mirandela is a city and a municipality in northeastern Portugal. The city itself has a population of about 15,000. The population of the municipality in 2011 was 23,850, in an area of 658.96 km². Mirandela is famous for its cuisine, particularly the alheiras. A round of the European Jetski Championship is held on the Tua River every Summer. The city has two campuses of higher education institutions - one belonging to the public Bragança Polytechnic Institute and one belonging to the private Instituto Piaget.

History
The settlements of Mirandela date back to the pre-historical period, but primarily relate to a period of Roman occupation. During this era, the main settlement of Mirandela was a Roman civitas, known then as Caladunum. There are abundant vestiges of the Roman occupation in Castelo Velho, São Martinho, Mourel and Prado Pequeno, that include copper coins from the reign of Emperor Tiberius. At this time the civitas was located in the region of São Martinho, but there are conflicting references as to the location of the main settlement, and when it was moved. 
Ernesto de Sales, referenced three documents that localized the Christian village near São Martinho (even as another document in 1258 disputed the existence of the village of Mirandela in or near this region): 
 a charter, written by King Sancho I to Garcia Mendes, in 1198, to a location in Vilar de Maçada;
 a charter, written by King Afonso III conceded on 25 May 1250 to Mirandela; and
 a receipt made by notary in Mirandela, on 27 March 1275.
It is clear, from the documents of King Denis, at the time when he was elaborating the defenses of the city of Guarda (2 September 1282), the transfer of the town of Mirandela to hilltop of mount São Miguel (where a small hermitage chapel existed at the time) had likely already occurred. This location was easily defendable and dominated the view of the fertile lands and river access.

King Afonso III granted a foral (charter) on 25 May 1250. The magistrate of Mirandela at the time governed a region that included Torre de D. Chama, Frechas, Sesulfe, Nozelos, Vilas Boas, Vale de Asnes and Cortiços.

This document was expanded and elaborated by King Denis of Portugal, when he issued an updated foral on 7 March 1291, that also stipulated that every villager, who was able to do so, contribute a horse and arms and annual stipend on São Miguel day, in September. King Denis also ordered the construction of protective walls around the main settlement and keep to support military needs. By the beginning of the 16th century, there were no remnants of a castle or walls. The castle was then describe as having three gates (Santo António, Santiago and Portela) and small doorway (São José), in addition to a traitors-gate near Quebra-Costas. It also included battlements and interior keep, near the prison block, that served as the royal residence, on his return.

The Távora family was donated Mirandela around 1301, when King Denis signed over its title to Branca Lourenço, remaining in this hereditary clan until Francisco de Assis de Távora (1721-1759).

The new foral later outlined the geographic divisions of the municipality. Between 1530 and 1835, the municipality of Mirandela included the following 44 places and 9 estates: Abambres, Ala, Alvites, Avantes, Brinço, Cabanelas, Caravelas, Carvalhais, Cedães, Cedainhos, Chelas, Contins, Freixeda, Mascarenhas, Miradeses, Mirandela, Pousadas, Quintas, São Salvados, Val de Lobo, Val de Salgueiro, Valtelhas, Vila Nova, Vila Verde and Vilar de Ledra. Similarly, between 1512 and 1871, the region underwent a series of territorial divisions that included the creation (and eventual suppression) of the municipalities of Torre de Chama, Frechas, Vale de Asnes, Abreiro, Lamas de Orelhão. Torre de Chama would be the most discontinuous: it was created 1287 by King Denis, but  suppressed on 12 September, later to be resuscitated on 4 May 1512 by King Manuel, and then extinguished in 1855. A royal decree on 18 July 1835, preceded another territorial division that caused the elimination of various parishes and municipalities: Mirandela was left with 40 parishes (that included Cedainhos and Vale da Sancha). By 1884, the municipality of Mirandela had the established geographic boundaries. 
 
The town of Mirandela was elevated to the status of city on 28 June 1984.

Railway
Until 2009, Mirandela was served by the Tua line - a narrow gauge railway which ran from Bragança to Tua. The section north of Mirandela to Bragança closed in the early 1990s; the line to Tua closed in 2009. However, until 2018 a short section of the line north of Mirandela was still open to local  passenger services as the Metro de Mirandela.

Geography
The municipality is bordered by the municipalities of Murça, Valpaços, Vinhais, Bragança, Macedo de Cavaleiros, Vila Flor and Carrazeda de Ansiães, and is located in the district of Bragança.

Climate

Mirandela has a Mediterranean climate (Köppen: Csa) with hot dry summers and cool wet winters.

It is one of the driest municipalities in Portugal, receiving almost a third of the precipation of nearby Braga.

Parishes

Administratively, the municipality is divided into 30 civil parishes (freguesias):
 

 Abambres
 Abreiro
 Aguieiras
 Alvites
 Avantos e Romeu
 Avidagos, Navalho e Pereira
 Barcel, Marmelos e Valverde da Gestosa
 Bouça
 Cabanelas
 Caravelas
 Carvalhais
 Cedães
 Cobro
 Fradizela
 Franco e Vila Boa
 Frechas
 Freixeda e Vila Verde
 Lamas de Orelhão
 Mascarenhas
 Mirandela
 Múrias
 Passos
 São Pedro Velho
 São Salvador
 Suçães
 Torre de Dona Chama
 Vale de Asnes
 Vale de Gouvinhas
 Vale de Salgueiro
 Vale de Telhas

Notable people 
 Luciano Cordeiro (1844–1900) a Portuguese writer, historian, politician and geographer.
 Jesualdo Ferreira (born 1946) a Portuguese football manager.
 Eurico Carrapatoso (born 1962) a Portuguese composer.
 Paulo Lopes (born 1978) a former football goalkeeper with 282 club caps.
 Eduardo Carvalho (born 1982) a Portuguese footballer with 419 club caps and 36 for Portugal

Gallery

References

External links

Municipality official website
Photos from Mirandela
School of Communication, Administration and Tourism - Bragança Polytechnic Institute official website

 
Municipalities of Bragança District
Cities in Portugal
Populated places in Bragança District